David Barclay Dowling (born August 23, 1942) is an American former professional baseball player. In the latter game, which would be his last in the Major Leagues, he pitched a complete game, 7–2 victory over the Cincinnati Reds at Wrigley Field on September 22, 1966.

Dowling signed with the Cardinals in 1963 after attending the University of California, Berkeley. After winning ten of 14 decisions in the high minors in 1964, Dowling was recalled to St. Louis during September, when rosters are expanded from 25 to 40 players. The Cardinals were embroiled in a tense, four-team scramble for the National League pennant, and Dowling saw action in only one game, the penultimate October 3, 1964, contest against the New York Mets at Busch Stadium. He pitched the ninth inning of a lopsided 15–5 loss to the last-place Mets, facing five batters and allowing two singles but no runs. But the defeat proved to be only a temporary setback for the Redbirds, as they won the NL championship on the season's last day (by one game over the Reds and Philadelphia Phillies) on October 4 and went on to win the 1964 World Series championship.

The following season, Dowling was claimed on waivers by the Cubs and he spent two years in the Chicago farm system before an end-of-season recall in 1966. The last-place Cubs started him against Cincinnati on September 22 and Dowling yielded only two earned runs — both coming in the first inning — on ten hits, going the distance to defeat veteran Reds' lefthander Joe Nuxhall.  He never pitched again in the Majors, spending 1967 and 1968 working for minor league affiliates of the Cubs, Cardinals and San Francisco Giants.  All told, Dowling yielded 12 hits in ten MLB innings, with no bases on balls and three strikeouts.

References

External links
 

1942 births
Living people
Arkansas Travelers players
Baseball players from Washington (state)
Chicago Cubs players
Dallas–Fort Worth Spurs players
Jacksonville Suns players
Major League Baseball pitchers
Phoenix Giants players
St. Louis Cardinals players
Tacoma Cubs players
Tulsa Oilers (baseball) players
Alaska Goldpanners of Fairbanks players